Radio Cab Murder is a 1954 British crime film directed by Vernon Sewell and starring Jimmy Hanley, Lana Morris and Sonia Holm. It was made at Walton Studios and on location around Kensington and Notting Hill in London. The film's sets were designed by the art director John Stoll. It was made as a second feature and was released by the independent Eros Films.

Plot
After serving a term in prison for safe-cracking, World War Two veteran and ex-con Fred Martin finds work as a taxi cab driver. He is engaged to be married to Myra, the cab company's dispatcher, a former member of the Women's Royal Naval Service. While picking up a fare, Martin witnesses a bank robbery and tails the criminals, but his cab is wrecked during the chase. The police find a well-known safe-cracker dead of apparent natural causes and ask Martin to go undercover, join the bank-robbery gang, and expose its leader. His boss arranges a sham firing based on his having wrecked his cab, but this causes a revolt among the cabbies, who plan to go on strike to support his reinstatement. The robbery is carried off, but the gang discovers Martin's identity and tries to kill him by locking him in a deep freezer at an ice cream factory. He is saved by his cabby comrades, his boss, and Myra, who ride to the rescue and corner the crooks with the aid of the police.

Cast
 Jimmy Hanley as Fred Martin 
 Lana Morris as Myra 
 Sonia Holm as Jean 
 Jack Allen as Parker 
 Sam Kydd as Spencer 
 Pat McGrath as Henry 
 Michael Mellinger as Tim 
 Charles Morgan as Maclaren
 Bruce Beeby as Inspector Rawlings 
 Rupert Evans as Williams
 Elizabeth Seal as Gwen
 Jack Stewart as Gregson 
 Frank Thornton as Inspector Finch
 Trevor Reid as Commissioner
 Edwin Richfield as Nat
 Jane Harwood as Cashier
Madge Brindley as Mrs Evans
 Joan Carol as Scientific Officer
 Leonard Sharp as Evans, the first Watchman (uncredited)
 Ian Wilson as Second Watchman (uncredited)
 Vernon Greeves as Radio Operator (uncredited)

Critical reception
The Radio Times gave the film two out of five stars.
TV Guide also gave two out of five stars, and wrote, "a good cast is all that saves this weakly scripted effort."
Sky Movies also rated the film two out of five stars, and noted, "Vernon Sewell was both a competent and prolific director in the genre and brings a professional crispness that many of his contemporaries lacked."

References

Bibliography
 Chibnall, Steve & McFarlane, Brian. The British 'B' Film. Palgrave MacMillan, 2009.

External links
 

1954 films
1954 crime films
British crime films
British black-and-white films
Films directed by Vernon Sewell
Films shot in London
Films set in London
Films shot at Nettlefold Studios
Eros Films films
1950s English-language films
1950s British films